Derek Waldeck (born February 1, 1998) is an American soccer player who currently plays for USL League One club One Knoxville.

Playing career

Youth, college and amateur
Waldeck played youth soccer with FC Los Angeles, SCV Magic and Real So Cal in California before playing college soccer at Stanford University. During his time at Stanford, Waldeck made 89 appearances, scoring 6 goals and tallying 22 assists. He won two NCAA National Championships with Stanford, and was named to the United Soccer Coaches All-Far West Region First Team and All-Pac-12 First Team in his senior season.

While at college, Waldeck played with USL League Two side Southern California Seahorses in both 2018 and 2019.

MLS SuperDraft
On January 13, 2020, Waldeck was selected 66th overall in the 2020 MLS SuperDraft by FC Dallas.

North Texas SC
On February 14, 2020, Waldeck signed with North Texas SC, the USL League One affiliate of FC Dallas. He made his professional debut on July 25, 2020, starting in a 2–1 victory over Forward Madison.

Greenville Triumph
On August 16, 2022, Waldeck signed with USL League One side Greenville Triumph.

One Knoxville
Waldeck joined League One expansion club One Knoxville on January 27, 2023.

References 

1998 births
American soccer players
Association football midfielders
FC Dallas draft picks
Greenville Triumph SC players
Living people
MLS Next Pro players
North Texas SC players
One Knoxville SC players
Soccer players from California
Southern California Seahorses players
Sportspeople from Santa Clarita, California
Stanford Cardinal men's soccer players
USL League One players
USL League Two players